The Messalo is a major river of northeastern Mozambique. The river flooded its banks in March 2000 during the 2000 Mozambique flood.

The 247 highway crosses the Messalo River. The major settlements on the river include Natulo and Marere (on the coast).

Geography
It is the 8th largest river among the 18 major river basins that drain Mozambique.

Mesalo River, the second largest river in the Cabo Delgado Province in northern Mozambique, delimits on its south the coastal area, along the Indian Ocean coastal belt, in the Macomia District; other coastal area boundary limits are set by the Diquide to the south and the coast line on the east. The estuary encompasses  of pristine mangrove forests unaffected by anthropogenic interference.

Agriculture
Agriculture, which is mostly at the subsistence level, practiced along rivers, swamps and lakes near the villages, covers cultivation of rice, cassava, millet, maize, sweet potatoes, beans and coconuts. Along the Messalo River, alluvial grasslands offer fertile soils that have moisture retaining potential in the dry season. These lands are used for the cultivation of rice and other crops. There are possibilities of rising two crops of rice. Rice plantation is done in Nov/Dec and harvested around May/June. However, there are complaints of crops getting destroyed due to wild life depredations.

Fauna and flora
It is characterized by acacia and palm savannah, coastal forest, and miombo woodland. The river delta of the Messalo and the Zambezi are home to some of the most dense mangrove forests in the region.

Lion, leopard and elephant inhabit the area. The Nothobranchius sp.

In the coastal estuary of the river, its wetlands are a breeding ground for birds, several fish and crustacean species. Alluvial silt is deposited in the estuary. In general, the coastal belt, which subsumes the Messalo estuary (the hot spot of biodiversity), has rich marine vegetation, apart from mangroves, such as sea grass meadows.
The wild life, in the mostly uncharted region of the coastal zone, includes marine wildlife comprising turtles and dugongs in large numbers. Wildlife found consists of elephant, buffalo, various antelope (waterbuck, eland, greater kudu, sable, suni, oribi, duiker), pigs and primates, elephant shrew, predators such as hyena, leopard, wild dog (in packs of 20 or more), lion (in large numbers of 2000 or more); African elephant and the wild dog species are categorized as 'endangered' in the IUCN Red List of Threatened Animals. Elephants, black rhinoceros, impala, zebra, Lichtenstein's hartebeest, wildebeest, cheetah and reedbuck, though reported in the past, await reconfirmation. The coastal zone does not have any human population within its limits, except for a few villages along the  stretch of main road to Mocimboa de Praia (Macomia-Mocimboa road) bordering the project boundary. Fishing is an important vocation for the people living in the estuary, though "Transient fishermen" competing with them in this economic activity is a disadvantage. Molluscs and crustaceans are gathered by women in the intertidal zone for their consumption. Sea cucumbers are also harvested and dried for commercial sale. White lime or building material is produced by using specific varieties of gastropods (Chicoreus ramosus, Fasciolaria trapezium).

References

Rivers of Mozambique